Freewheeler may refer to:

Noun

 Someone acting freely or even irresponsibly.
 A person who is primarily concerned with having a good time.

Transport
Harley-Davidson Freewheeler
 The Freewheelers (car club), a gay classic car club

Blood Bikes (UK motorcycle courier charities)
 Freewheelers EVS, primarily operating in Somerset, Bristol, Bath and North East Somerset, North Somerset, South Gloucestershire and western parts of Wiltshire
 Devon Freewheelers, primarily operating in Devon
 Midland Freewheelers, primarily operating in the West Midlands
 Severn Freewheelers, primarily operating in Gloucestershire, Herefordshire, Worcestershire and north Wiltshire
 Yeovil Freewheelers, primarily operating in Dorset, Somerset

Music
 The Freewheelers (band)
Freewheeler (album), an album by David Ball  
 "Freewheeler", a song from the album Cowboy Songs Four by Michael Martin Murphey

Other uses
 Freewheelers (TV series), a British television series made from 1968 to 1973

See also
 Freewheel (disambiguation)